The 1988 Virginia Slims of Dallas was a women's tennis tournament played on indoor carpet courts at the Moody Coliseum in Dallas, Texas in the United States and was part of the Category 4 tier of the 1988 WTA Tour. It was the 18th edition of the tournament and ran from February 8 through February 14, 1988. First-seeded Martina Navratilova won the singles title.

Finals

Singles

 Martina Navratilova defeated  Pam Shriver 6–0, 6–3
 It was Navratilova's 1st singles title of the year and the 130th of her career.

Doubles

 Lori McNeil /  Eva Pfaff defeated  Gigi Fernández /  Zina Garrison 2–6, 6–4, 7–5
 It was McNeil's 1st title of the year and the 12th of her career. It was Pfaff's 1st title of the year and the 5th of her career.

References

External links
 ITF tournament edition details
 Tournament draws

Virginia Slims of Dallas
Virginia Slims of Dallas
Virginia
Virginia
Virginia Slims of Dallas
Virginia Slims of Dallas